Greatest Hits Live (also known as Odyssey Live and the 30th Anniversary Tour) was the eleventh concert tour by British band Take That, in support of their greatest hits album, Odyssey (2018). The tour began in Sheffield, England at FlyDSA Arena on 12 April 2019, and ended on 8 September 2019, in Gibraltar  at Victoria Stadium, consisting of 53 shows.

Set list
UK & Ireland Leg:

"Greatest Day" 
"It Only Takes a Minute" 
"These Days" 
"Could It Be Magic" 
"Everything Changes"  (with Robbie Williams on screen) 
"Travel Interlude"
"Out of Our Heads"
"A Million Love Songs" 
"Sure" 
"Love Ain't Here Anymore" 
"Spin"
"Cry"
"Said It All"  
"How Deep Is Your Love"  (with Bee Gees on screen) 
"Break Up Interlude"
"Let's Do It Again Interlude"
"Patience" 
"The Flood"
"Back For Good"
"Get Ready For It" 
"Everlasting"
"Giants" 
"Shine" 
"Never Forget" (with The Cube Choir ft Lucy) 
"Relight My Fire"  (with Lulu and The cube Choir ft Henni)
"Babe" 
"Pray" 
"Rule the World"

European Leg:
"Greatest Day"
"Shine"
"Get Ready For It"
"Giants"
"Patience"
"Pray"
"Everything Changes"
"It Only Takes a Minute"
"Could It Be Magic"
"Babe"
"A Million Love Songs"
"Back For Good"
"Out of Our Heads"
"Everlasting"
"These Days"
"The Flood"
"Cry"
"Relight My Fire
"Rule the World"
"Never Forget"

Tour dates

Odyssey: Greatest Hits Live
Take That broadcast their Cardiff Principality Stadium show live in cinemas on 8 June. Odyssey: Greatest Hits Live was released as a limited edition DVD/CD and Blu-ray on 15 November 2019.

Band
Musical Director, Keys, Guitar, Sax: Mike Stevens
Guitars: Milton McDonald
Bass guitar: Lee Pomeroy
Drums: Donavan Hepburn
Keyboards: Marcus Byrne

References

Take That concert tours
2019 concert tours